The 25th Buil Film Awards ceremony was hosted by the Busan-based daily newspaper Busan Ilbo. It was held on October 7, 2016, at the BEXCO Auditorium in Busan and was emceed by actor On Joo-wan and announcer Ahn Hee-sung.

Nominations and winners
Complete list of nominees and winners:

(Winners denoted in bold)

References

External links
 
25th Buil Film Awards at Daum 

2016 film awards
Buil Film Awards
2016 in South Korean cinema
October 2016 events in South Korea